Nanivitrea alcaldei is a species of small freshwater snail that has an operculum, an aquatic gastropod mollusk in the family Hydrobiidae.

Distribution 
Nanivitrea alcaldei is endemic to the Cárdenas, Cuba, and has only one known population in Cuba. This species has not been found recently and may no longer exist.

Description 
This small snail is less than 3 mm in maximum dimension.

References 

Hydrobiidae
Gastropods described in 1947
Endemic fauna of Cuba